Taiohae is the main town on Nuku Hiva island. The town is located on a former volcanic crater, which has partly collapsed into the ocean, creating a bay.

This is the site of Fort Madison, set up by Porter in 1813.

External links

References

Populated places in the Marquesas Islands